Hydnobius is a genus of round fungus beetles in the family Leiodidae. There are about seven described species in Hydnobius.

Species
These seven species belong to the genus Hydnobius:
 Hydnobius acarinus Peck and Cook, 2009
 Hydnobius autumnalis Peck and Cook, 2009
 Hydnobius kiseri Hatch, 1936
 Hydnobius laticeps Notman, 1920
 Hydnobius longidens LeConte, 1879
 Hydnobius pumilus LeConte, 1879
 Hydnobius substriatus LeConte, 1863

References

Further reading

 
 
 
 
 
 
 

Leiodidae
Articles created by Qbugbot